Remedy was a Canadian medical drama series which premiered on Global on February 24, 2014. It ran for two seasons.

The series starred Dillon Casey as Griffin Conner, a medical school dropout working as an orderly at the fictional Bethune General Hospital in Toronto, where his father Allen (Enrico Colantoni) is the chief of medical staff. The cast also included Genelle Williams, Sara Canning, Sarah Allen, Patrick McKenna, Catherine Disher, Matt Ward, Martha Burns and Niall Matter.

The series was produced by Indian Grove Productions. Production and casting were announced in fall 2013. On May 1, 2014, Global announced that Remedy had been renewed for a 10 episode second season. On May 22, 2015, show creator, Greg Spottiswood, tweeted that Global had cancelled Remedy.

Plot
The series follows Griffin Conner (Dillon Casey), son of the Chief of Staff (Enrico Colantoni), brother to both a surgeon (Sara Canning) and a nurse (Sarah Allen), and now—medical school dropout. Having been kicked out in a haze of disgrace, Griffin is forced to return to Bethune General Hospital as its newest porter, where he gets a new perspective on a world he thought he knew through a colourful cast of cleaners, project aides, transport workers, and more.

Season two kicks off nine months after the finale with each member of the Conner family pulled out of their comfort zones and Bethune Hospital in the midst of a colossal shake up. Griffin Conner seems to finally be getting his life on track with plans to return to medical school and a serious girlfriend, but his dark and troubled past continues to haunt him. Meanwhile, Allen must re-adjust following his demotion from Chief-of-Staff, while his daughters –surgeon Mel and new mom Sandy – search to balance co-parenting baby Maya with work and play. This season also sees the introduction of new ER Resident Dr Cutler (played by Niall Matter), who is set to stir things up for the Conners.

Cast and characters

Main
 Dillon Casey as Griffin Conner
 Sara Canning as Dr. Melissa Conner
 Enrico Colantoni as Dr. Allen Conner, acting chief of staff and father of the Conner family
 Sarah Allen as Sandy Conner
 Matt Ward as Dr. Brian Decker, doctor and former fiancé of Sandy Conner (season 1)
 Martha Burns as Rebecca Baker, a lawyer and matriarch of the Conner family
 Genelle Williams as Zoe Rivera
 Diego Fuentes as Bruno Dias
 Stephanie Belding as Lonnie Masterson
 Patrick McKenna as Frank Kanaskie
 Niall Matter as Dr. Peter Cutler, heartthrob ER resident who shamelessly ruffles feathers and turns heads throughout the halls of Beth-H (season 2)

Recurring
 Catherine Disher as Linda Tuttle, an ICU doctor who is promoted to Chief of Staff when Allen loses the position.
 Brendan Gall as Jerry, an anesthetist and Melissa's brief love interest.
 Laara Sadiq as Dr. Summers, the lead ER doctor.
 Anusree Roy as Nurse Patel, an ER nurse.
 Ann Pirvu as Josey the Therapeutic Clown.

Series overview

Season 1

Season 2

Broadcast

International
The American network Ovation began to air the series on January 11, 2021.

Awards and nominations

Canadian Screen Awards

Directors Guild of Canada Awards

Young Entertainer Awards

References

External links

2014 Canadian television series debuts
2015 Canadian television series endings
2010s Canadian drama television series
2010s Canadian medical television series
Global Television Network original programming
Television shows filmed in Toronto
Television shows set in Toronto
Television series by Corus Entertainment